Dance Your Troubles Away is a 1975 studio album by American funk band Archie Bell & the Drells, released by the record label TSOP Records and recorded at Sigma Sound Studios in Philadelphia, Pennsylvania.

Track listing
 "Let's Groove" (Leon Huff, Gene McFadden, John Whitehead, Victor Carstarphen) - 6:04
 "I Could Dance All Night" (Allan Felder, Bunny Sigler, Ron Tyson) - 2:34
 "I Won't Leave You Honey, Never" (Bunny Sigler, Ron Tyson) - 9:02
 "Dance Your Troubles Away" (Gene McFadden, John Whitehead, Victor Carstarphen) - 6:21
 "The Soul City Walk" (Gene McFadden, John Whitehead, Victor Carstarphen) - 4:22
 "Let's Go Disco" (Cary Gilbert, Leon Huff, Gene McFadden, John Whitehead, Victor Carstarphen) - 3:46
 "I Love You But You Don't Even Know It" (Gene McFadden, John Whitehead, Victor Carstarphen) - 4:05

Personnel
Archie Bell, James Wise, Lee Bell, Willie Pernell - vocals

1976 albums
Archie Bell & the Drells albums
Albums produced by Kenneth Gamble
Albums produced by Leon Huff
Albums arranged by Bobby Martin
Albums recorded at Sigma Sound Studios
TSOP Records albums
Disco albums by American artists